West Street is part of an expressway in Manhattan, New York City.

West Street may also refer to:

 West Street Chapel, a Methodist chapel in London
 West Street District, a historic district in Boston, Massachusetts
 West Street subway station, a Glasgow Subway station serving the Tradeston area
 West Street (Manhattan), a section of the West Side Highway in New York City

See also
W Street (disambiguation)